The third inauguration of Franklin D. Roosevelt as president of the United States was held on Monday, January 20, 1941, at the East Portico of the United States Capitol in Washington, D.C. This was the 39th inauguration and marked the commencement of the third, and eventually final full term of Franklin D. Roosevelt as president and the only term of Henry A. Wallace as vice president. This was the first and only time a president has been inaugurated for a third term; after the Twenty-second Amendment to the United States Constitution was ratified in 1951, no person can be elected president more than twice.

Chief Justice Charles Hughes administered the presidential oath of office to Roosevelt for the third and final time, who placed his hand upon the same family Bible used for his 1933 and 1937 inaugurations, open to 1 Corinthians 13, as he recited the oath. The outgoing vice president, John Nance Garner, administered the vice presidential oath to Wallace.

See also
Presidency of Franklin D. Roosevelt
First inauguration of Franklin D. Roosevelt
Second inauguration of Franklin D. Roosevelt
Fourth inauguration of Franklin D. Roosevelt
1940 United States presidential election

References

External links
1941 inauguration sources
Official 1941 Presidential Inaugural Medal
1941 inauguration badges
Video of Roosevelt's Third Inaugural Address (Reel 1) (via YouTube)
Video of Roosevelt's Third Inaugural Address (Reel 2) (via YouTube)
Text of Roosevelt's Third Inaugural Address
Audio of Roosevelt's Third Inaugural Address (via YouTube)

Roosevelt, Franklin 1941
Inauguration 1941
Roosevelt inaug
Roosevelt inaug
January 1941 events